American School for Girls may refer to:
 The American School for Girls in Lebanon, now Lebanese American University
 American School for Girls (Iraq) in Baghdad, Iraq